Nazir Ahmad Khan also known as Nazir Gurezi (born December 31, 1966) is an Indian Politician from Jammu and Kashmir (union territory). He was born in Badwan, Gurez, Bandipora. He is the leader of the Jammu & Kashmir National Conference Party, Gurezi and has been elected 3 times as the MLA from Gurez Assembly constituency between 2002 and 2018.

He was serving as the Deputy Speaker of Jammu and Kashmir Legislative Assembly, before the assembly was dissolved in 2018 and the state of Jammu & Kashmir ceased to exist on 6 August 2019.

He has also served as the Minister for Jammu and Kashmir Animal and Sheep Husbandry Department from 2008 - 2014, and is the only minister who has represented Gurez in any council of ministers.

Early life

Nazir Ahmad Khan was born to Hamidullah Khan on December 31, 1966. He did his schooling at the Govt Boys Hr. Sec School Gurez and then completed his graduation from Govt Degree College, Sopore. Being a graduate, he joined the politics at a very young age and contested 1996 Assembly and 1999 parliamentary elections where he lost. Nazir Gurezi, who left the post of Secretary General in Janata Dal joined NC and in 2002, he was elected to the Assembly on NC ticket.

Khan won the Gurez seat for the second  time in the 2008 Assembly elections after defeating his closest challenger Faqir Mohammad Khan with victory margin of 732 votes. Out of 15,390 votes in Gurez, 11,392 were polled in 2008 with polling percentage at 74.02.

Detention

On the intervening night of 4 and 5 August 2019, Nazir Ahmad Khan was placed under preventive detention by the Indian Government under Section 107 of the CRPC. This came as a backdrop to the government's decision of scrapping Article 370 of the Constitution of India, which gave the state of Jammu & Kashmir semi-autonomous powers and after the expiry of the 104 days detention without any charges, Gurezi was released by Govt of India.

References 

Jammu & Kashmir National Conference politicians
Jammu and Kashmir MLAs 2014–2018
Jammu and Kashmir MLAs 2008–2014
Kashmiri people
1966 births
Living people